The 1000s (pronounced "one-thousands") was a decade of the Julian Calendar which began on January 1, 1000, and ended on December 31, 1009.

Science and technology
 The scientific achievements of the Islamic civilization reach their zenith. Major works from this decade include  Ibn al-Haytham (Alhacen)'s Book of Optics, Abu al-Qasim al-Zahrawi (Abulcasis)'s 30-volume medical encyclopedia, the Al-Tasrif.
Other significant contributions to scientific and mathematical understanding were made by Avicenna, who would later publish influential works on medicine, Persian Muslim polymath and scientist Abu Rayhan al-Biruni, Arab Egyptian Muslim mathematician and astronomer Ibn Yunus, Persian Muslim physicist and mathematician Abu Sahl al-Quhi (Kuhi) and Persian Muslim astronomer and mathematician, Abu-Mahmud al-Khujandi.
 The Law of sines is discovered by Muslim mathematicians.
 Bell foundry is founded in Italy.
 Gunpowder is invented in China.

Significant people
 Abd al-Rahman Ibn Yunus
 Al-Qadir caliph of Baghdad
 Abu al-Qasim al-Zahrawi (Abulcasis)
 Abu-Mahmud al-Khujandi
 Abu Nasr Mansur
 Abu Rayhan al-Biruni
 Alhacen (Ibn al-Haytham)
 Avicenna (Ibn Sina)
 Basil II
 Boleslaus I of Poland
 Brian Boru
 Bruno of Querfurt
 Robert II of France
 Robert Guiscard
 Roger I of Sicily
 Sancho III of Navarre
 Stephen I of Hungary
 Sweyn I of Denmark
 Tsar Samuil of Bulgaria

References